The Rally Catalunya (formerly: Rallye Catalunya) is a rally competition held in Catalonia region of Spain, on the World Rally Championship schedule. Now held on the wide, smooth and sweeping asphalt roads around the town of Salou, Costa Daurada, it was previously held around the region of Costa Brava. In the 2012 season, the rally was held 8–11 November.

Rally de Catalunya was first held in 1957; in 1988 it was merged with the Rally Costa Brava and renamed as Rally Catalunya – Costa Brava.

Winners since 1988 

† — The 1994 rally only counted for the 2-Litre World Cup.

Multiple winners

References

External links

 Official site
 Rally Catalunya at eWRC-results

 
Catalunya
Recurring sporting events established in 1988
Catalunya